Kaleb Ngatoa (born 11 May 2001), is a New Zealand Māori motor racing driver.

Career
Before his switch to car racing, Ngatoa was one of the country's most successful karting talents. He started karting in 2011 and immediately shot to prominence by winning the cadet class of the NZ CIK Trophy. Two seasons later he was on the top step of the championship podium again winning the 100cc Junior Restricted Class of the Kartsport NZ North Island Sprint Championship. 2015 saw him claim the Kartsport NZ North Island Sprint Championship in the Rotax Junior class. 2016 followed where he won the Giltrap Group Kartsport NZ Sprint Championship in the Junior Rotax class and demonstrated a seamless transition to circuit racing in the same year by winning the Formula First winter series run at Circuit Chris Amon, Manfeild.

Ngatoa would enter his first car racing national championship racing in the New Zealand Formula First Championship in 2017. Ngatoa finished runner-up to Callum Crawley in a tight championship fight decided in the final round. The following year, he would contend the Toyota Finance 86 Championship, with modest results, picking up a race win at the final round at Hampton Downs Motorsport Park. Following a challenging Toyota Finance 86 Championship campaign filled with multiple mechanical issues, Ngatoa moved into the highly competitive New Zealand Formula Ford Championship for the 2019/20 season. Ngatoa again struggled with car reliability and mechanical issues, though picked up top 5 and podium results.

Following the New Zealand Formula Ford Championship, Ngatoa would contend the Toyota Racing Series for the 2021 season. The series proved as a stomping ground for the Marton teen, picking up 3 podiums in 9 races. Ngatoa's main season highlight would prove to be his masterful pole position for the 2021 New Zealand Grand Prix in the wet, against the likes of Shane van Gisbergen and Chris van der Drift. Ngatoa would go on to claim second in the championship behind Matthew Payne. Following this, Ngatoa secured a drive in the S5000 Australian Drivers Championship for the remaining 3 rounds in 2021.

Racing record

Career summary

* Season still in progress.

Complete S5000 results

* Season still in progress.

Complete Formula Regional Oceania Championship Results
(key) (Races in bold indicate pole position) (Races in italics indicate fastest lap)

References

External links
 

New Zealand racing drivers
2001 births
Formula Ford drivers
Toyota Racing Series drivers
New Zealand Māori sportspeople
People from Marton, New Zealand
Living people

Formula Regional Americas Championship drivers
M2 Competition drivers